The Senate is the upper house of the South Dakota Legislature. It consists of 35 members, one representing each legislative district; it meets at the South Dakota State Capitol in Pierre.

Composition
98th Legislature (2023)

Officers

List of current senators

Past composition of the Senate

See also
South Dakota House of Representatives
Members of the South Dakota State Senate (1889–present)

Notes

External links
Project Vote Smart - State Senate of South Dakota
South Dakota Senate Roster

References

Senate
Pierre, South Dakota
State upper houses in the United States